Grabiela Nidioska Concepción Guzmán, is a pageant titleholder from Puerto Cabello, Carabobo state, Venezuela who competed in the Miss Venezuela 2008 pageant on September 10, 2008, and won the title of 2nd runner up. She won the Miss Carabobo 2008 title in a state pageant held in Valencia, Venezuela on 13 June 2008.

Concepción represented Venezuela in the Top Model of The World 2010 pageant, in Dortmund (Germany), on February 21, 2010, where she placed as the 1st runner up.

She also represented Venezuela in Miss Continente Americano 2010 on September 18, 2010, in Guayaquil, Ecuador; and placed in the 6 finalists.

References

External links
Miss Venezuela Official Website
Miss Venezuela La Nueva Era MB
Miss Carabobo 2008

1989 births
Living people
Venezuelan female models
People from Puerto Cabello